The following is a list of the 20 largest cities and towns in Austria by population. Further below are individual lists of cities, towns and municipalities in Austria divided by state.

List of largest cities by population

The capitals of the federated states are shown in boldface.

Lists of cities, towns and municipalities divided by state
Municipalities and population as of 2015

Burgenland

Carinthia

Lower Austria

Salzburg

Styria

Tyrol

Upper Austria

Vienna

Vorarlberg

See also
Geography of Austria

References

External links

en.php Inhabited places of Austria database

 
Austria
Cities and towns
Austria

he:אוסטריה#ערים